STCC may  refer to:
 Sandiacre Town Cricket Club
 Scandinavian Touring Car Championship, a defunct touring car series
 Springfield Technical Community College, a community college in Springfield, Massachusetts, United States
 Subtropical Countercurrent, an eastward jet in the central North Pacific
 Swedish Touring Car Championship, a former touring car racing series
 STCC – The Game, a video game
 Swiss Tech Convention Center, a conference centre
 STCC TCR Scandinavia Touring Car Championship, a touring car series based in Scandinavia
 St Clare's College, Canberra, an all girls school in Canberra, Australia